Medial pterygoid may refer to:
 Medial pterygoid muscle
 Medial pterygoid nerve
 Medial pterygoid plate